A Handbook on Drug and Alcohol Abuse: The Biomedical Aspects by Gail Winger, Frederick G. Hofmann, and James H. Woods was published in New York by Oxford University Press in 1992. A 4th edition, updated with a chapter for "Club Drugs", was published in 2004.

Description

Reception
The book garnered a mixed reception from medical journals. An earlier version was published in 1975 by Frederick Hofmann and Adele Hofmann as Handbook on Drug and Alcohol Abuse.

References

Handbooks and manuals
Health and wellness books
Oxford University Press books